The Goddard Earth Observing System (GEOS) is an integrated Earth system model and data assimilation system developed at the Global Modeling and Assimilation Office (GMAO) at NASA's Goddard Space Flight Center.  The components of the model use the Earth System Modeling Framework (ESMF), enabling them to be connected in a flexible manner and supporting the investigation of many different aspects of Earth science, in particular questions related to coupled processes involving the atmosphere, ocean, and/or land.  Uses of GEOS span a range of spatiotemporal scales and include the representation of dynamical, physical, chemical and biological processes.

References 

Earth system sciences
Goddard Space Flight Center
Numerical climate and weather models
Science software
Weather prediction